SuperClash was a series of major professional wrestling shows promoted by the American Wrestling Association (AWA) between 1985 and 1990, often co-promoted with other North American wrestling promotions. AWA held a total of four SuperClash shows, with the third being broadcast on pay-per-view (PPV), AWA's only PPV show.

Dates, venues and main events

See also
 AWA on television

References

 
1988 in professional wrestling
1990 in professional wrestling
American Wrestling Association shows
Continental Wrestling Association
Jim Crockett Promotions shows
National Wrestling Alliance pay-per-view events
World Class Championship Wrestling shows
Professional wrestling in the Chicago metropolitan area
Professional wrestling in Saint Paul, Minnesota
Recurring events established in 1985
Recurring events disestablished in 1990
1985 establishments in the United States